The Most Recent Biographies of Chinese Dignitaries is a "Who's Who" on prominent individuals in the Republic of China, compiled in Japan by Asahi Shimbun during the Second Sino-Japanese War. Published on 2 February 1941, the work references 343 contemporary notables in the Kuomintang and the Nationalist government, the Chinese Communist Party, the pro-Japanese Wang Jingwei regime and Mengjiang, and independent politicians and celebrities.

A digitization of the reference work can be found on the website of the National Diet Library of Japan, the full list of biographies follows.

Biographies 
The following list is arranged in gojūon order, based on the Japanese pronunciation of the names.

References 

Japanese-language books
Second Sino-Japanese War
1941 non-fiction books
Biographical dictionaries
China–Japan relations
Wang Jingwei regime
Mengjiang
Asahi Shimbun Company